Mawken Seyitqamzaüli (born November 1952) is a retired Chinese politician of Kazakh ethnicity who served as vice chairman of the Xinjiang Regional Committee of the Chinese People's Political Consultative Conference from 2013 to 2016, vice chairman of the Standing Committee of the People's Congress of Xinjiang Uygur Autonomous Region from 2012 to 2013, governor of Ili Kazakh Autonomous Prefecture from 2007 to 2012, and governor of Altay Prefecture from 2003 to 2007.

Biography
Mawken Seyitqamzaüli was born in Altay Prefecture, Xinjiang, in November 1952. After a year of studying at the Translation Class of CPC Qinghe County Committee in July 1967, he became a sent-down youth in Dongfeng People's Commune and then Hongqi People's Commune. Since October 1972, he successively worked as a translator and interpreter in the Office of CPC Qinghe County Committee, CPC Altay Prefecture Committee, and CPC Ili Kazakh Autonomous Prefecture Committee. 

In February 1984, he rose to become deputy director of the Office of Altay Prefecture People's Government, and held that office until June 1992, when he was appointed director of the Commercial Office of Altay Prefecture. In June 1994, he was elevated to deputy secretary-general of Altay Prefecture People's Government, a position at department level. In December 1996, he became deputy governor of Altay Prefecture, rising to governor in May 2003. In September 2007, he took office as deputy party secretary of Ili Kazakh Autonomous Prefecture, concurrently holding the governor position two months later. In January 2012, he became vice chairman of the Standing Committee of the People's Congress of Xinjiang Uygur Autonomous Region, and a year later, vice chairman of the Xinjiang Regional Committee of the Chinese People's Political Consultative Conference, serving in the post until his resignation in January 2016.

He was a delegate to the 10th and 11th National People's Congress, and a member of the 12th Standing Committee of the Chinese People's Political Consultative Conference.

References

1952 births
Living people
People from Altay Prefecture
Xinjiang Radio and Television University alumni
Ili Kazakh Autonomous Prefecture governors
People's Republic of China politicians from Xinjiang
Chinese Communist Party politicians from Xinjiang
Delegates to the 10th National People's Congress
Delegates to the 11th National People's Congress
Members of the 12th Chinese People's Political Consultative Conference